Üyench is a sum (district) of Khovd Province in western Mongolia. It is 305 km away from the city of Khovd.

History
In 1968 a research team investigated 31 monuments dated to the Bronze and Early Iron Age near the border of Altai and Üyench sums.

References

Districts of Khovd Province